Kenneth Berridge Wood known as Ken Wood was a rugby union centre who played 121 times for Leicester Tigers between 1906 and 1919, scoring 33 tries and 4 drop goals for points total of 115.  Wood made his Leicester debut on 13 October 1906 at Welford Road against Bristol.  He played in two Midlands Counties Cup-winning sides and in 1908 represented Midlands and East Midlands Counties in their win against Australia.

Wood was also a member of the 1910 British Lions tour to South Africa and played in the first and third test, both were lost.

Wood later emigrated to South Africa where he died in 1968.

Sources
Farmer,Stuart & Hands, David Tigers-Official History of Leicester Football Club (The Rugby DevelopmentFoundation )

References

1885 births
1968 deaths
English rugby union players
Rugby union centres
British & Irish Lions rugby union players from England
Leicester Tigers players
Rugby union players from Leicester